Mount Tukuhnikivatz is a 12,482-foot (3,805 meter) elevation summit located in San Juan County of Utah, United States. Mount Tukuhnikivatz is the third-highest peak of the La Sal Mountains, and is the premier ski mountaineering destination in the La Sals. It is situated in a dry, rugged, sparsely settled region, and set on land administered by Manti-La Sal National Forest. Precipitation runoff from this mountain drains into tributaries of the Colorado River. The nearest town is Moab,  to the northwest, and the nearest higher neighbor is Mount Peale,  to the east. The mountain's name is a Native American word that translates as "Where the sun sets last." Locals call it Mount Tuk for short. This mountain has a subsidiary peak unofficially called Little Tuk (12,048 feet), approximately one-half mile to the north-northwest.

Climate
Spring and fall are the most favorable seasons to visit Mount Tukuhnikivatz. According to the Köppen climate classification system, it is located in a Cold semi-arid climate zone, which is defined by the coldest month having an average mean temperature below 32 °F (0 °C), and at least 50% of the total annual precipitation being received during the spring and summer.

Gallery

See also

 Colorado Plateau
 List of mountain peaks of Utah

References

External links
 Weather forecast: Mount Tukuhnikivatz
 Summit view: YouTube
 Tukuhnikivatz pronunciation

Tukuhnikivatz
Tukuhnikivatz
Tukuhnikivatz